San Vero Milis is a comune (municipality) in the Province of Oristano in the Italian region Sardinia, located about  northwest of Cagliari and about  north of Oristano.

San Vero Milis borders the following municipalities: Baratili San Pietro, Milis, Narbolia, Riola Sardo, Tramatza, Zeddiani.

Demographic evolution

References

Cities and towns in Sardinia